Bella Coola is a community in the Bella Coola Valley, in British Columbia, Canada.  Bella Coola usually refers to the entire valley, encompassing the settlements of Bella Coola proper ("the townsite"), Lower Bella Coola, Hagensborg, Salloompt, Nusatsum, Firvale, and Stuie.  It is also the location of the head offices of the Central Coast Regional District.

The entire Bella Coola Valley has a population of 2,163 as of the 2021 census.  This was an increase of 8% from the 2016 census, when the population was 2,007.

Geography
The primary geographical structure of the community, both in terms of physical structures and population distribution, is the long, narrow Bella Coola River valley.  The river meanders along the eastern and northern edges of the town before discharging into the head of North Bentinck Arm.

Highway 20 (known over most of its length as the Chilcotin Highway) stretches from the Government wharf (on the Pacific Ocean) through the extent of the populated portion of the valley before climbing to the Chilcotin Plateau, and the entire population of the community lives either on this road or very near to it.

In recent years, the mountainous terrain around (and accessible from) the Bella Coola Valley has been advertised for heliskiing. Skiing movies have been filmed in the area.

Name
"Bella Coola" is an exonym and corruption of the Heiltsuk bḷ́xʷlá, meaning "somebody from Bella Coola" or "stranger". The Nuxalk endonym for the local region is "Nuxalk", and the endonym for the specific village site of Bella Coola is "Q'umk'uts" The name Bella Coola has been used to refer to the entire Bella Coola valley, and at times to the entire ethnic region, not to any village in particular. Increasingly the term "Nuxalk Territory" is used for the entire region, and Bella Coola refers specifically to the river valley. Sir Alexander Mackenzie referred to it as 'Rascal's Village'.

Climate
Bella Coola's climate is a moderate oceanic climate (Köppen Cfb) due to its proximity to the Pacific Ocean, falling exactly on the borderline with the warm-summer humid continental climate (Köppen Dfb) and close to the warm-summer Mediterranean climate (Köppen Csb) and the warm-summer continental Mediterranean climate (Köppen Dsb). However, its summers are warmer than coastal places much further south due to its semi-inland position. The maritime air is made warmer by the passage of the outer islands, but is stronger in terms of winter moderation. This results in a climate that far belies its northerly latitude in North America. There is a strong drying tendency in summer, but remains above the dry-summer climates that are often referred to as cs climates (mediterranean).

Transport

Road
There is a 454 km mostly paved road connection by Highway 20 to Williams Lake. The road was built in 1953 by local residents, and features a 15 km ascent from the Valley floor to the Chilcotin plateau, gaining 1600m in elevation to the summit at Heckman Pass, via a number of steep grades & switchbacks. The construction of this road was described in the books "Bella Coola" and "A Road Runs West".

The road's ascents are also gaining popularity for cycling.

Air
Bella Coola is served by the Bella Coola Airport (on Highway 20, in Hagensborg), 14 km distant from the townsite which has a 1,280 metre runway made of asphalt. Pacific Coastal Airlines offers scheduled traffic to Vancouver and Anahim Lake. Charter services by both plane and helicopter are also available.

Marine ferry
BC Ferries provides a vehicle/passenger service in the summer (mid-June - mid-September) to Port Hardy on the northern tip of Vancouver Island. The voyage includes two connecting ferries: the Nimpkish from Bella Coola to Bella Bella then  the Northern Expedition to Port Hardy. Reservations are essential as the Nimpkish carries only 16 cars and operates about twice a week.  Travellers should be aware that Nimpkish has no amenities and the trip takes 9.5 hours, plus 7 hours on the Northern Expedition. In 2014, the large ferry Queen of Chilliwack which had provided direct service between Bella Coola and Port Hardy since 1995 was cancelled due to provincial government cutbacks.

In 2017, BC Ferries announced the purchase of a 150 passenger, 35-vehicle vessel to again provide direct service between Port Hardy & Bella Coola starting 19 June 2018.

During the rest of the year (mid-September to mid-June), ferry service is provided twice a month and connects Bella Coola to the outlying coastal communities of Bella Bella, Shearwater and Ocean Falls, with passengers able to transfer at McLoughlin Bay (Bella Bella) to a ferry serving either Prince Rupert and Klemtu, or Port Hardy. The sailing schedule varies throughout the season.

History

The Nuxalk people were present in the Bella Coola valley prior to any formal written history of the area. This is confirmed both by oral history that continues unbroken to present day, and by written history of some of the first European explorers of the area.

In 1793, Alexander MacKenzie arrived from the east, completing the first recorded crossing of the continent north of Mexico.

Immigration (non-Nuxalk) to the region was sporadic and often temporary for the next century. A Hudson's Bay fur trading post was set up at the mouth of the river (the land granted to the post forms the off-reserve portion of the present-day "townsite"), and a handful of farmers were granted land farther up the valley.  The trading trails of the Nuxalk and neighbouring nations became a popular route from the Pacific Ocean to central British Columbia, particularly during the Cariboo Gold Rush of the 1860s.  In the 1870s, the valley was surveyed as a potential Pacific terminus of the Canadian Pacific Railway; (Burrard Inlet was the eventual choice, its selection giving birth to the city of Vancouver).

In 1894, after their previously-existing community in Minnesota suffered an internal conflict, a group of Norwegian Lutheran settlers were given land grants in the valley, conditional upon land clearing and the construction of residences. The land they were granted, as well as other land previously granted to individuals was, in many cases, land that had been occupied by Nuxalk communities only a few decades (or less) earlier. However, the 1862 Pacific Northwest smallpox epidemic had decimated the Nuxalk population, and the survivors had, for the most part, gathered on land close to the mouth of the river (and close to the Hudson's Bay post).  The Norwegian settlement was named Hagensborg and remains one of the main communities of the Bella Coola Valley. Although much of the Norwegian colony's population did migrate away, others stayed to work in forestry and in the development of the fishing industry. The cannery at Tallheo, across the arm from Bella Coola, was founded by a Norwegian settler who had given up on farming in the area.

These two populations (Norwegian settlers and Nuxalk), in varying proportions, continued to make up the vast majority of the community's population for most of the next century. However, in recent years, the Norwegian population (or connection to a Norwegian identity) has declined. In 2001, 43% of the population reported "Aboriginal identity", of which the vast majority is Nuxalk, while only 10% reported Norwegian (or Norwegian-Canadian) to be their "Ethnic Origin".

When the community of Ocean Falls suffered a massive population decline in 1980/81, due to the closure of the town's primary industry (a paper mill), Bella Coola became the administrative centre for British Columbia's central coast. This led to the relocation of the Central Coast Regional District (which, up until that time had been called the "Ocean Falls Regional District") offices to Bella Coola, and a general centralization of government services such as provincial government regional centres (e.g. Ministry of Forests) in Bella Coola.

Economy
Bella Coola has a more diversified economy than might be expected among a population of its size.  Fishing, forestry, public service (government/education), retail and tourism all contribute significantly to the economy.  There is some limited agriculture, including an active farmers' market, processing of locally-caught seafood, a number of craftmakers and artists (including several celebrated Nuxalk artisans) and a fish hatchery.  The only financial institution in Bella Coola is a branch of the Williams Lake & District Credit Union, heir to a sixty-plus-year tradition of the Bella Coola Valley Credit Union.

In popular culture
In the 2008 film The Incredible Hulk, the main character, Bruce Banner / Hulk concludes the plot by escaping to Bella Coola, where he attempts to control his transformations. Significant footage for the film was shot in and near Bella Coola, though only very limited amounts were retained in the finished product.

Elected representatives

Regional district
The Bella Coola Valley includes Electoral Areas C, D and E of the Central Coast Regional District (CCRD)
Electoral Area C: Alison Sayers
Electoral Area D: Richard Hall
Electoral Area E: Samuel Schooner

Provincial
The Bella Coola Valley is located within the North Coast electoral district of the British Columbia Legislative Assembly. The riding is represented by New Democrat MLA Jennifer Rice.

Federal
The Bella Coola Valley lies within the Canadian Parliamentary riding (electoral district) of Skeena—Bulkley Valley, currently represented by New Democrat Taylor Bachrach.

Notable people 
 Banchi Hanuse, film maker
 Anna Höstman, composer

See also  
Bella Coola Music Festival

References
 Nater, Hank F. (1984). The Bella Coola Language. Mercury Series; Canadian Ethnology Service (No. 92). Ottawa: National Museums of Canada.

External links

Bella Coola Valley Tourism association official website
Bella Coola and its environs, a description

Populated places on the British Columbia Coast
Unincorporated settlements in British Columbia
Nuxalk
Bella Coola Valley
Populated places in the Central Coast Regional District
Designated places in British Columbia